Erice is a historic town and comune in the province of Trapani, Sicily, in southern Italy.

Geography
Casa Santa forms part of Erice at the base of Mount Erice, immediately adjacent to Trapani. A cable car joins the upper and lower parts of Erice.

The bordering municipalities are Buseto Palizzolo, Paceco, Trapani, Valderice and Custonaci. The hamlets (frazioni) are Ballata, Casa Santa, Crocefissello, Napola, Pizzolungo, Rigaletta, San Cusumano and Torretta.

History

The ancient Greek name of Erice was Eryx ( in Greek), and its foundation was associated with the eponymous Greek hero Eryx. It was not a Greek colony, as the Phoenicians founded it, but was largely Hellenized. It was destroyed in the First Punic War by the Carthaginians, and from then on declined in importance.

Eryx was conquered by the Aghlabids in 831 and was renamed as Cebel Hamid (in Western sources Gebel Hamed, meaning Mountain of Hamid). It was ruled by the Arabs until the Norman conquest. In 1167 the Normans renamed it Monte San Giuliano, a name maintained until the 20th century.

20th Century
In 1934 the town changed its name from Monte San Giuliano to Erice.
 
During the Second World War a Luftwaffe Operations Centre (associated with  Zerstörergeschwader 26 and Jagdgeschwader 27 which operated out of the nearby Trapani–Milo Airport) was located on the slopes of Monte Erice from early 1943 until they were forced by Allied air raids to relocate.   Following the Allied invasion of Sicily in 1943 troops of the 2nd Battalion of the  505th Infantry Regiment  Seventh Army under the command of Major Mark Alexander began on 22 July 1943 to climb up the side of Monte Erice in order to secure the town and its commanding position overlooking the surrounding countryside. As they did so they came under artillery fire from Italian forces stationed on the ramparts with one soldier being killed and another wounded. Realizing that the safest position was directly under the walls of town the lead troops took shelter there. Rather than waiting on artillery support to arrive the decision was then made for F Company to attack. However before the troops had come close enough to engage them the Italian forces signaled their surrender.

Main sights

In the northeastern portion of the city there are the remains of ancient Elymian and Phoenician walls (Cyclopean masonry) indicating different stages of settlement and occupation in antiquity.

There are two castles that remain in the city: Pepoli Castle, which dates from Saracen times, and the Castello di Venere ("Venus Castle"), dating from the Norman period, built on top of the ancient Temple of Venus, where Venus Ericina was worshipped. According to legend, the temple was founded by Aeneas. It was well known throughout the Mediterranean area in the ancient age, and an important cult was celebrated in it. In his book On the Nature of Animals, Aelian writes that animals chosen for sacrifice would voluntarily walk up to the altar to be killed.

A cable car (funivia) ran from 2005 to 2017, when it was closed due to a forest fire, from the outskirts of Trapani to the town of Erice. The cable car was rebuilt and reopened in June 2018.

Culture
Erice hosts scientific meetings at the Ettore Majorana center, organised by the controversial astrophysicist Antonino Zichichi.
There is also an annual workshop on Molecular Gastronomy.

Gallery

References

External links

 Panoramic view from Erice castle 
 Erice Photo Essay

Elymians
Archaeological sites in Sicily
Phoenician colonies in Sicily